The Reading T-1 was a class of 4-8-4 "Northern" type steam locomotives owned by the Reading Company. They were rebuilt from 30 "I-10sa" class 2-8-0 "Consolidation" type locomotives between 1945 and 1947. Out of the 30 rebuilt, 4 survive in preservation today, those being numbers 2100, 2101, 2102 and 2124.

Design
By the turn of the 20th century, the Philadelphia and Reading Company had approximately 800 I class 2-8-0 "Consolidation" types constructed by the Baldwin Locomotive Works in Philadelphia, Pennsylvania, as well as the Reading's own locomotive shops in Reading, since it was introduced for them in 1880. The Vaulcain compound "culm" burners built in the early 1890s were followed by the anthracite coal burners, which the company decided to use anthracite as their steamer's primary fuel source, thus they would be built with wider fireboxes. Those 2-8-0s built in the 20th century included eighty-five I-8a class locomotives built between 1910 and 1914, numbered 1501-1533 and 1566-1617, and then eighty I-9a class locomotives in 1918 and 1922, numbered 1625-1637, 1650-1660, 1670-1684 and 1900-1924, and then the I-10sa class locomotives between 1923 and 1925, numbered 2000-2049. In the latter group, a tractive effort of 71,000 pounds is attained, as compared with 19,390 pounds of the 19th century-built 2-8-0s. The husky consolidations were solely used for heavy freight service on the Reading's Branch lines, and sometimes, on the Main line.

Before World War II came to a close, the Reading was looking for even heavier and more powerful locomotives than their M class 2-8-2 "mikados" or their K class 2-10-2 "Santa Fe" types for the ever so heavier trains, as well as replacing their N class 2-8-8-2 Mallets. However, just as the case with other railroads, the Wartime Production Board denied the company from building a new locomotive design, but allowed them to rebuild or modify their existing locomotives. Thus, between 1945 and 1947, just as the war was over, the Reading brought twenty of their mallets Nos 1811-1830 and thirty of their consolidations Nos 2020-2049 into their locomotive shops in Reading. There, the mallets were converted into simple expansion locomotives, with some turning into 2-8-8-0s, and the 2-8-0s were heavily rebuilt into 4-8-4 "Northerns", and they were reclassified as T-1s and renumbered to 2100-2129. Their four-axle tenders were replaced with larger six-axle tenders, their driving wheel diameter was increased, they received two extra pilot wheels, and they received four trailing wheels to support their enlarged fireboxes. To fit the new cast steel engine beds supplied by General Steel Casting Corporation, the boiler was lengthened. This was done by replacing the first two boiler courses and adding a 187 in extension in addition to adding a new 111 in smokebox. The firebox was modified by adding thermic syphons and a combustion chamber.

Roller bearings supplied by Timken or SKF were used on the four wheel pilot and trailing trucks as well as the six wheel tender trucks. The first 20 examples (2100–2119) used plain (journal) bearings on the eight driving wheels, while the final 10 (2120–2129), intended for both freight and passenger service, had roller bearings throughout. The driving wheels themselves used the Boxpok design with a diameter of 70 in.

Service
The T-1 class entered service between 1945 and 1947 and were used primarily in fast freight service. Their operating territory encompassed most of the Reading system and they were frequently used in pool service with the Western Maryland Railway and became the basis for that road's "Potomac" class of 4-8-4s.

Assigned to freight service, these 4-8-4s primarily saw use on time-sensitive mixed freights as well as coal trains and also saw use in pusher service. In regular service, the T-1s were cleared to pull trains up to 150 cars in length. Despite being assigned to freight service, the T-1s were capable of powering passenger trains if needed, and the last 10 were equipped with steam heating for this purpose; cab signals were also added to 10 for use on the Bethlehem Branch in 1948. In actual service however, the T-1s rarely handled passenger trains outside of post–World War II troop trains.

The working lives of the T-1s were relatively brief, with all being out of service by 1954. A traffic surge in 1955 brought some back in service. In June 1956, 9 T-1s (2107, 2111-2115, 2119, and 2128) were leased to the Pennsylvania Railroad, while others ran upstate in Pennsylvania on the RDG until early 1957. Some T-1s were also loaned as steam generators to Steel mills(Like 2102 being leased to Carpenter Steel Corporation). Upon returning to the Reading a year later, the PRR-leased engines, with the exception of 2128, were cut up for scrap.

Iron Horse Rambles
Beginning in 1959, the Reading Company began operating a series of excursions throughout its system using two of the T-1s. The first Ramble, pulled by T-1 2124, ran between Wayne Junction in Philadelphia to Shamokin. Four T-1s were held by the Reading for the Iron Horse Rambles: 2100 and 2124 would be used to pull the excursions, 2101 would be kept as a backup, and 2123 was used as a source of parts and eventually scrapped in 1966. The 2102, which had recently been loaned to Carpenter Steel Corp., joined the Rambles in 1962 to replace the 2124, which had developed a list of needed repairs, and it had been the first locomotive of the Rambles to be retired, and it was sold of to F. Nelson Blount for his Steamtown U.S.A. collection in Bellows Falls, Vermont. The Iron Horse Rambles lasted until 1964, and the three remaining T-1s were sold off by January 31, 1965.

In January 2022, the Reading, Blue Mountain and Northern Railroad announced a return of the Iron Horse Rambles for 4 dates in 2022, pulled by 2102.

Preservation
All four of the T-1s used in the Iron Horse Rambles excursion service survive and are the only remaining examples of the class.

2100 was sold to Streigel Equipment & Supply of Baltimore, Maryland in September 1967. It spent almost a decade in the firm's scrapyard until 1975, when it was purchased along with sister 2101 by Ross Rowland to be used as a source of spare parts for the former for his American Freedom Train. After 2101 was damaged in a fire in 1979, 2100 swapped tenders with its sister and was stored in the former Western Maryland Hagerstown, Maryland roundhouse until 1988, when a group called the 2100 corporation, which was led by Rowland and owner of Lionel Trains Richard Kughn, restored it to operating condition. They only used 2100 to run on the Whinchester and Western before it was eventually donated to the Portage Area Regional Transportation Authority, who in turn put it up for auction. Jerry Jacobson, who briefly test ran it on his Ohio Central Railroad, placed a bid on the locomotive, but he lost in 1998 to Thomas Payne. Payne moved 2100 to the former New York Central's St. Thomas, Ontario, Canada, shop, where it was converted to burn oil, with plans to use the locomotive to pull excursions throughout the Rocky Mountains. These plans never came to fruition, and in 2007, 2100 was moved to Tacoma, Washington where it briefly ran on the Golden Pacific Railroad's Tacoma Sightseer trains until 2008, when it was placed in outdoor storage in Richland, Washington. In 2015, 2100 was leased to the American Steam Railroad Preservation Association and moved to the former B&O roundhouse in Cleveland, Ohio where it is presently being restored to operating condition.

2101 was sold along with 2100 in September 1967 to Streigel Equipment & Supply of Baltimore, Maryland. It spent almost a decade in the firm's scrapyard until 1975, when it was purchased along with sister 2100 by Ross Rowland for use on his upcoming American Freedom Train, and subsequently renumbered to AFT 1. Restored to operating condition in 30 days, AFT 1 pulled the American Freedom Train throughout the eastern United States before handing the train over to ex-Southern Pacific 4449. In 1977, AFT 1 was renumbered back to 2101 and painted in the Chessie System livery for the Chessie Steam Special, an excursion train to celebrate the 150th birthday of the Baltimore and Ohio Railroad. 2101 ran these trips until November 1978. In March 1979, it was damaged in a roundhouse fire at Stevens Yard in Silver Grove, Kentucky. The Chessie System arranged a deal with Rowland and traded their Chesapeake and Ohio 614 for the 2101, which was cosmetically restored as AFT 1 for static display at the B&O Railroad Museum in Baltimore.

2102 was sold to Bill Benson of Steam Tours of Akron, Ohio in 1966 and spent the next 23 years running on various fan trips in the Northeast, Mid-Atlantic and Midwest and made a brief appearance on the Greenbrier Scenic Railroad running between Durbin and Cass, West Virginia. In 1985, 2102 was moved to Reading, Pennsylvania by the RCT&HS and used on their "40th Anniversary of the Reading T-1 series of Iron Horse Rambles" on Conrail former Reading Trackage. In May 1986, 2102 was purchased by Andy Muller for his Blue Mountain and Reading Railroad in Hamburg, Pennsylvania. 2102 spent the next six years pulling tourist trains on the BM&R as well as occasional off-line trips until its flue time expired in 1991. In 1995, 2102 was moved to Steamtown National Historic Site for a restoration which never occurred and was returned to Reading and Northern at Port Clinton, Pennsylvania in 1997 and was stored inside the Reading Blue Mountain and Northern Railroad's steam shop in Port Clinton, Pennsylvania, occasionally being brought out for display by the Port Clinton Station.  In January 2016. Reading Blue Mountain and Northern started a mechanical evaluation on the locomotive to see if it was in a suitable condition for restoration, and soon after announced the locomotive would be returned to service. 2102 was fired up for the first time in 30 years in January, 2021, and on April 6, 2022, the locomotive made its first test runs, restored to the black and yellow Iron Horse Rambles livery with Reading & Northern lettering. The 2102 made its excursion debut on May 28, 2022, hauling a 19 coach Iron Horse Rambles excursion between Reading Outer Station and Jim Thorpe, Pennsylvania.

2124, an all-roller-bearing-equipped locomotive, was purchased by New England seafood magnate and steam locomotive collector F. Nelson Blount in 1962 for static display at his Steamtown, U.S.A. museum in North Walpole, New Hampshire. In 1965, 2124 was moved to Steamtown USA's new location in Bellows Falls, Vermont. In 1984, 2124 along with the majority of the Steamtown collection was moved to Scranton, Pennsylvania. In 1986, ownership of 2124 was transferred to the United States National Park Service along with most of Steamtown, U.S.A.'s assets as part of the new Steamtown National Historic Site. Today, 2124 is on static display at Steamtown.

Accidents and incidents 
 On July 28, 1949, the 2101 suffered a catastrophic derailment, supposedly while pulling a freight train. The specific location is unknown, and it is unknown if the engineer, fireman, or leading brakeman were injured or killed.
 In 1968, the 2102 was pulling an excursion train on the Grand Trunk Western when a minor derailment damaged its hennessey oil lubricators on the second driving axle, and the lubricator was subsequently converted to a grease block. The locomotive sat idle for the next three years.
 In March 1979, a roundhouse at Stevens Yard in Silver Grove, Kentucky caught fire with the 2101 inside, causing the locomotive to be damaged beyond mechanical repair. Afterwards, it was traded to the B&O Railroad Museum in exchange for Chesapeake and Ohio 614, and it was cosmetically restored back to its American Freedom Train livery.

References

4-8-4 locomotives
Baldwin locomotives
Philadelphia and Reading Railroad locomotives
Freight locomotives
Railway locomotives introduced in 1945
Steam locomotives of the United States
Standard gauge locomotives of the United States
Rebuilt locomotives